Captain Eric William Edward Fellowes, 3rd Baron Ailwyn (24 November 1887 – 23 March 1976) was a British peer, the son of Ailwyn Edward Fellowes, 1st Baron Ailwyn. He succeeded to the Barony on 30 August 1936.

Fellows was educated at Stubbington House School and at HMS Britannia. He married Cecil Lorna Barclay (d.1976), on 5 June 1935.

In 1942 he was a member of British Parliamentary Mission to China, and from 1943 to 1948 he was President of the China Association.

He died, without issue, on 23 March 1976.

References

3
Ailwyn, Ronald Fellowes, 2nd Baron of
Ailwyn, Ronald Fellowes, 2nd Baron of
Royal Navy officers
Royal Navy officers of World War I
People educated at Stubbington House School